Ādolfs Bļodnieks (24 July 1889 – 21 March 1962) held the office of Prime Minister of Latvia from 24 March 1933 – 16 March 1934, for the New Farmers' Party.

Blodnieks was born in Tukums and died in Brooklyn, NY, United States.

Published works
 The Undefeated Nation. Speller & Sons, New York. 1960.

References

1889 births
1962 deaths
People from Tukums
People from Courland Governorate
Democrats Union politicians
New Farmers-Small Landowners Party politicians
Prime Ministers of Latvia
Members of the People's Council of Latvia
Deputies of the Constitutional Assembly of Latvia
Deputies of the 2nd Saeima
Deputies of the 3rd Saeima
Deputies of the 4th Saeima
Riga Technical University alumni
Recipients of the Order of the Three Stars
Latvian World War II refugees
Latvian emigrants to the United States